The following is a list of Tyne and Wear Metro stations.

Purpose-built stations
The following stations were built specifically for the Tyne and Wear Metro system.

Converted stations

These stations were built prior to the Metro system, but have since been converted or re-built for Metro use. All except Sunderland now serve Metro trains only.

This list does not include Fawdon, Bank Foot, and Regent Centre, which are located on the sites of the former Coxlodge, Kenton, and West Gosforth stations on what was once the Ponteland Railway, but which closed to passenger traffic in 1929; Pelaw, which was added to the Metro in 1985, and which is sited to the south of the former station of that name; Northumberland Park, opened 2005, built on the approximate site of the previous Backworth station, closed in 1979; and Palmersville, added in 1985, close to the short-lived Benton Square station (which was open 1909-1915). In addition, Jesmond, Manors, and Central Station are all purpose-built underground stations that were built near to, and share names with, previous suburban stations, and South Shields is built upon a bridge closer to the town centre than the previous mainline station of that name.

Proposed stations

There have been numerous suggestions for infill stations on the Metro since it opened, and five of these, Pelaw, Kingston Park, Palmersville, Northumberland Park and Simonside have been built and attract high patronage. Other plans that have been abandoned or are yet to be built include:

 Beaconsfield (between Tynemouth and Cullercoats): Proposed in the 1980s, but planned area development was abandoned.
 Dorrington Road (west of Fawdon): the proposed station was sited where the Newcastle bypass road was ultimately built.
 High Lane Row (between Hebburn and Jarrow): Construction to go ahead if the current single track is dualled. Both track dualling and this station are included in the latest proposals to central government.
 Pallion Bridge (between South Hylton and Pallion): Proposed to be built when Ford Estate and the former Grove Cranes site are redeveloped for business and residential use, and the New Wear Bridge is completed, opening up new areas of patronage in the Castletown, Ford Estate, Hylton Riverside and Alexandra Park areas.
 Stotts Road (between Walkergate and Wallsend): Proposed in the mid-1980s.
 Victoria Road West (between Pelaw and Hebburn): Mooted by South Tyneside government officials in 2008 to service South Tyneside college, which has since been closed and demolished. Currently, this is the longest stretch of track between two stations.

Notes

See also

References

Metro stations
Tyne and Wear

Tyne and Wear Metro